Catharine "Katy" Mans Bosio is an American biologist. She is a senior investigator and chief of the immunity to pulmonary pathogens section at the National Institute of Allergy and Infectious Diseases.

Early life and education 
Catharine Ann Mans was born to Penny and Bill Mans. She graduated from Washington State University, cum laude, with a B.S. in 1993. Bosio earned a Ph.D. at Colorado State University (CSU) in 1998. Her dissertation was titled Progress towards development of new diagnostic tests and vaccines for bovine tuberculosis. Bosio's doctoral advisors were Ian Orme and Dean Voss. She completed postdoctoral fellowships at the Center for Biologics Evaluation and Research and at the United States Army Medical Research Institute of Infectious Diseases, studying innate immunity to Mycobacterium tuberculosis, Francisella tularensis, Marburg virus, and Zaire ebolavirus.

Career and research 
Bosio was an assistant professor at CSU in the department of microbiology, immunology, and pathology. She joined National Institute of Allergy and Infectious Diseases (NIAID) in 2007. Bosio is a senior investigator and chief of the NIAID immunity to pulmonary pathogens section. Her laboratory studies the host response to pulmonary pathogens, with special emphasis on virulent F. tularensis and dendritic cells, macrophages, and monocytes. Bosio researches innate immunity to F. tularensis, vaccine development for pneumonic tularemia, and modulation of human cells by F. tularensis.

References 

Living people
Year of birth missing (living people)
Place of birth missing (living people)
National Institutes of Health people
21st-century American biologists
21st-century American women scientists
American medical researchers
Women medical researchers
American women biologists
Washington State University alumni
Colorado State University alumni
Colorado State University faculty
American women academics